The 2006 Junior League World Series took place from August 13–19 in Taylor, Michigan, United States. El Campo, Texas defeated Guaymas, Mexico in the championship game.

Teams

Results

United States Pool

International Pool

Elimination Round

References

Junior League World Series
Junior League World Series